Kakkarai is a village in the Orathanadu taluk of Thanjavur district, Tamil Nadu, India.

Demographics 

As per the 2001 census, Kakkarai had a total population of 1,495 with 730 males and 765 females. The sex ratio was 1.048. The literacy rate was 70.44%.

References 

 

Villages in Thanjavur district